Bimal Jalan (born 17 August 1941) is a former Governor of Reserve Bank of India and
was a nominated member of the Upper House of India's Parliament, the Rajya Sabha during 2003–2009.

Education and career 
Jalan graduated from Presidency College, Calcutta, and later attended Cambridge and Oxford but no further detail as to his course of study is known publicly.

Jalan held several administrative and advisory positions in the Government of India, namely, Chief Economic Adviser in the 1980s, Banking Secretary between 1985 and 1989 and Finance Secretary, Ministry of Finance between January 1991 and September 1992. In 1992-93 and then from 1998–2008, Jalan was the President of the Governing Body of the National Council of Applied Economic Research,  Planning Commission in New Delhi.

He was the Governor of Reserve Bank of India for two terms. The Government of India reappointed Jalan as Governor of the Reserve Bank of India, first for a period of five years commencing 22 November 1997 to 21 November 2002 and again for a further period of two years commencing from 22 November 2002 and ending 21 November 2004. He was succeeded by Y. Venugopal Reddy on 6 September 2003. During his tenure the Indian Rupee note of 1000 denomination was introduced.

Selected works 
India's Economic Crisis: The Way Ahead (Oxford University Press, 1991)
The Indian Economy: Problems and Prospects (editor) (Penguin, 1993).
India's Economic Policy: Preparing for the Twenty-first Century (Viking, 1996) examines some of the critical policy choices for India at the present juncture.
The Future of India Politics, Economics and Governance (Penguin, 2005).
India's Politics: A view from the backbench (Penguin-Viking, 2007).

References

Presidency University, Kolkata alumni
Marwari people
20th-century Indian economists
Governors of the Reserve Bank of India
1941 births
Living people
Rajasthani politicians
University of Calcutta alumni
Nominated members of the Rajya Sabha
People from Churu district
21st-century Indian economists
21st-century Indian politicians
Chief Economic Advisers to the Government of India
Reserve Bank of India